The Lincolnshire is a grand mansion at 22 Hidden Road and 28 Hidden Way in Andover, Massachusetts, United States.

History 
The mansion was built between 1897 and 1898 for Henry Bradford Lewis (1868-1951), who made a considerable fortune from his scouring mills in Lawrence. Lewis was in charge of the three mills of the E. Frank Lewis Co. and the American Lanolin Co., which employed 500 persons at their peak.

The architects of the house were Merrill & Cutler of Lowell. It was formerly attributed to George G. Adams of Lawrence, who designed a similar mansion for Lewis' father in that city.

At his death in 1951, Lewis left this house and its greenhouse, to his wife Lillian. The house was too large to be maintained for only one occupant, and the building was sold in 1953 to C. Lincoln Giles and converted into apartments. The carriage house is now a single-family residence.

The mansion was added to the National Register of Historic Places because it is distinguished:

 by its association with a wealthy Lawrence manufacturer
 as an excellent example of around the start of the 20th-century architecture on a grand scale.

Architecture 
The house was built in the Colonial Revival style structure with some Palladian and Queen Anne elements, along with ocular windows. It has cross-gambrel pavilions and a small window in an exterior chimney. The original, Colonial Revival carriage house at the rear is similarly large in scale, with wood shingles and a large gambrel roof.

See also
National Register of Historic Places listings in Andover, Massachusetts
National Register of Historic Places listings in Essex County, Massachusetts

References

Further reading 
Essex Country Registry of Deeds, Lawrence & Salem (1130–205; 1075–56; 780/315; 770/532; 770/534; 154/483; Probate Docket No. 233195)
Bulletin of the National Association of Wool Manufacturers, 1932, ed. by Walter Humphreys, Vol. LXII. Boston, MA, Murray Printing co., 1932.
History of Massachusetts Industries, Orra L. Stone, Vol III. boston, MA, S.J. Clarke Publishing Co., 1930
Lawrence Up to Date, 1845–1895. Lawrence, MA: Rushforth & Donoghue, 1895.
Andover Townsman, "Obituary: H. Bradford Lewis, industrialist, Dies." January 25, 1951.

Buildings and structures in Andover, Massachusetts
Houses completed in 1898
National Register of Historic Places in Andover, Massachusetts
Houses on the National Register of Historic Places in Essex County, Massachusetts
1898 establishments in Massachusetts